There are many tourist attractions in Pyongyang, the capital of North Korea. Many are unique as remnants of communist iconography and monumentalist and brutalist architecture. Tourists are not allowed to move freely and the authorities control which sights visitors can access.

List
 18 September Nursery
 Academy of Koryo Medicine
 Althletics Gymnasium
 April 25 House of Culture
 Arch of Reunification
 Arch of Triumph
 Basketball Gymnasium
 Central Botanical Gardens
 Central Youth Hall
 Changgwang Health Complex
 Chilsongmun
 Chollima Statue
 Chongnyu Restaurant
 Combat Sports Gymnasium
 East Pyongyang Grand Theatre
 East Pyongyang No. 1 Middle School
 Grand People's Study House
 Handball Gymnasium
 Indoor Swimming Pool Complex
 International Cinema Hall
 Juche Tower
 Kaeson Youth Park
 Kang Ban-sok Advanced Middle School
 Kim Chaek University of Technology
 Kim Hyong Jik University of Education
 Kim Il-sung Square
 Kim Il-sung Stadium
 Kim Il-sung University
 Kim Song-ju Elementary School
 Kim Won-gyun University of Music
 Kimilsungia and Kimjongilia Exhibition Hall
 Korea Central Zoo
 Korea Stamp Exhibition Hall
 Korea Stamp Museum
 Korean Art Gallery
 Korean Central History Museum
 Korean People's Army Circus
 Korean People's Army Military Hardware Museum
 Korean Revolution Museum
 Kumrung Leisure Complex
 Kumsusan Palace of the Sun
 Kwangbopsa
 Mangyongdae Children's Palace
 Mangyongdae Funfair
 Mangyongdae Wading Pool
 Mangyongdae
 Mansu Hill Grand Monument
 Mansudae Art Studio
 Mansudae Art Theatre
 Mausoleum of Tangun
 Meari Shooting Range
 Mirae Scientists Street
 Mirim Riding Club
 Monument to Party Founding
 Moranbong Park
 Moranbong Theatre
 Munsu Water Park
 Okryu Children's Hospital
 Okryu-gwan
 Party Founding Museum
 People's Palace of Culture
 People's Theatre
 Pothonggang Circus Theatre
 Potongmun
 Pyongyang Bell
 Pyongyang Circus
 Pyongyang Embroidery Institute
 Pyongyang Gold Lane
 Pyongyang Grand Theatre
 Pyongyang Indoor Stadium
 Pyongyang Informatics Centre
 Pyongyang International Football School
 Pyongyang International House of Culture
 Pyongyang Maternity Hospital
 Pyongyang Metro
 Pyongyang Ostrich Farm
 Pyongyang Peoples Outdoor Ice Rink
 Pyongyang Skatepark
 Pyongyang Students and Children's Palace
 Railway Revolution Museum
 Revolutionary Martyrs' Cemetery
 Rungra People's Pleasure Ground
 Rungra Waterpark
 Rungrado 1st of May Stadium
 Ryongak Mountain
 Ryongwang Pavilion
 Sosan Stadium
 State Gift Hall
 Table-Tennis Gymnasium
 Taedongmun
 Taekwon-Do Hall
 Taesong Fortress
 Taesongsan Pleasure Ground
 Three Revolutions Exhibition
 Tomb of King Tongmyŏng
 Ulmil Pavilion
 
 Victorious War Museum
 Volleyball Gymnasium
 Weightlifting Gymnasium
 Wrestling Gymnasium

See also

 List of amusement parks in North Korea
 List of football stadiums in North Korea
 List of hotels in North Korea
 List of museums in North Korea
 List of theatres in North Korea
 Revolutionary Sites
 Tourism in North Korea

References

Works cited

External links

 

 
Pyongyang
Pyongyang